Aristide Drouet (9 June 1903 – 5 April 1949) was a French racing cyclist. He rode in the 1929 Tour de France.

References

1903 births
1949 deaths
French male cyclists
Place of birth missing